Hyloxalus lehmanni is a species of frog in the family Dendrobatidae. It is found widely in Colombia from Antioquia southwards (Cordillera Occidental and Cordillera Central) to northern Ecuador (Cotopaxi Province).

Description
Males measure  and females  in snout–vent length. Abdomen is black in males but white or gray in females. An oblique lateral stripe that extends to eye is present.

Habitat and conservation
Its natural habitats are very humid montane forest, but it has also been found in open fields and very modified areas. It always occurs near streams.

Hyloxalus lehmanni is common in Colombia, but has dramatically declined in Ecuador, possibly due to chytridiomycosis. Also habitat loss, introduction of alien predatory fish, and pollution are threats.

References

lehmanni
Amphibians of Colombia
Amphibians of Ecuador
Amphibians described in 1971
Taxonomy articles created by Polbot